Durvinita is seen as the most successful ruler of the Western Ganga dynasty. Son of the previous ruler, Avinita, Durvinita's accession to the throne was disputed by his brother, who had gained the support of the Pallavas and Kadambas. There are Nallala and Kadagattur inscriptions that refer to this dispute. However, Durvinita managed to grab the throne by virtue of his valour.

Hostilities with Pallavas and Kadambas
During Durvinita's rule, the hostilities between the Pallavas and Gangas came to forefront and several pitched battles were fought by the two kingdoms. Durvinita defeated the Pallavas in the battle of Anderi. Though the Pallavas sought the assistance of the Kadambas to the north to tame Durvinita, the Gummareddipura inscription hails that Durvinita overcame his enemies at Alattur, Porulare and Pernagra. It is possible that these victories enabled him to extend his power over Kongudesa and Tondaimandalam regions of Tamil country.

Ties with Chalukyas
Durvinita was a clever king. In order to keep the Pallavas at bay, he gave his daughter to Chalukya Vijayaditya or from the Nagara record to Pulakesi II, though the latter is unlikely owing to the difference in their eras. The Chalukyas were an emerging power at this time. When the Pallavas attacked the Chalukyas, he fought on the Chalukya side and cemented a long lasting friendship with the Chalukyas that lasted through the rule of both the Badami Chalukyas, Rashtrakutas and Kalyani Chalukyas, covering a period of over 600 years. The Gummareddipura and the Uttanur plates describe Durvinita as the Lord of Punnata.

Religion 

Durvinita was a disciple of the Jain monk Pujyapada, and his court had several Jain scholars. Such tolerance was common among later Ganga kings, who actually took to Jainism in the later centuries.

A 977 CE inscription states that Durvinita commissioned the construction of a Jain temple (basadi); the inscription records a grant by Indrakirti Munindra to this temple.

Literature 

Durvinita was a scholar and patronized several learned men, including his tutor Pujyapada. According to Avanti-sundari-katha-sara, a work attributed to Dandin, Durvinita's court hosted the Sanskrit poet Bharavi for some time. The Nallala grant inscription, issued during the 40th year of his reign, states that he was an expert at composing poetry, stories, dramas, and commentaries.

Durvinita was well-versed in Sanskrit and Kannada languages. Amoghavarsha's Kannada-language text Kavirajamarga hails Durvinita as one of the early writers in Kannada prose, though no Kannada works by him survive. According to multiple Ganga grant inscriptions, such as the Gummareddipura inscription, Durvinita wrote a Kannada-language commentary on Canto 15 of Bharavi's Kirātārjunīya.

The Ganga inscriptions, such as the Gummareddipura inscription, also suggest that he composed a Sanskrit version of Brihatkatha (Vadda-katha). These inscriptions also describe him as Shabdavatara-kara, suggesting that he composed the Shabdavatara (a work on grammar). However, Shabdavatara is a work of his tutor Pujyapada.

References

Bibliography

External links
 History of Karnataka by Dr.Arthikaje
 History of Ganga Dynasty - Dr. Jyotsna Kamat
 

6th-century Indian monarchs
History of Karnataka
Kannada-language writers
529 births
579 deaths
People of the Western Ganga dynasty
Sanskrit writers
6th-century Indian scholars
6th-century Indian writers